Honnelles is a municipality of Wallonia located in the province of Hainaut, Belgium. 

The name comes from the two rivers which cross the municipality, Grande Honnelle and Petite Honnelle.

On 1 January 2006 Honnelles had a total population of 4,998. The total area is 43.65 km² which gives a population density of 114 inhabitants per km².

The municipality consists of the following districts: Angre, Angreau, Athis, Autreppe (town centre), Erquennes, Fayt-le-Franc, Marchipont, Montignies-sur-Roc, Onnezies and Roisin.

References

External links
 

Municipalities of Hainaut (province)